Nirmala is a genus of beetles in the family Carabidae, containing the following species:

 Nirmala indica (Hope, 1831)
 Nirmala odelli Andrewes, 1930

References

Pterostichinae